The Fox Theater Pomona is a fully restored Art Deco movie palace from Hollywood's golden age in Pomona, Los Angeles County, California. Today the Fox Theater Pomona is a state-of-the-art venue for concerts, cinema, performances, and parties.  It is the flagship attraction of the Pomona Arts Colony, a vibrant neighborhood of galleries, nightclubs, lofts, and restaurants.

History

Opened on April 24, 1931, the Fox Theater Pomona operated as a first-run motion picture theater for 50 years. The classic "Hollywood Style" art deco building with its soaring tower was designed by  the firm of Balch & Stanberry and was frequently used by Hollywood studios to host sneak previews of their upcoming films in order poll general audience reactions. The theater went into decline along with other large, single screen theaters in the early 1970s as a result of the increasing popularity of multiplex theaters. It survived for a few years showing Spanish language movies, then closed in 1977.

Partly as a result of citizen activism, the city of Pomona bought the building. In 2002 the non-profit Pomona Fox Corporation was founded to explore means of preserving and reusing the theater, but they were not able to secure enough funding for their restoration efforts. In February of 2007 the building was sold to its current owners, the Tessier family (who are also responsible for the creation of the Pomona Arts Colony concept and re-developers of many local buildings of historical importance) and their family-owned Gerald Investments. 10 million dollars was spent restoring the building into a beautifully revamped venue for the arts, music and film. After two years of restoration, The Fox Theater Pomona reopened on May 21, 2009, with a capacity for roughly 2,000 attendees. It has been ranked #23 in LA Weekly's top 50 Venues in LA.

Location
114 W 3rd St.
Pomona, CA 91766 Pomona, California

External links
Fox Theater Pomona's Official Website
Fox Theater Pomona - LA Conserancy

References

Cinemas and movie theaters in Los Angeles County, California
Movie palaces
Buildings and structures in Pomona, California
Theatres in Los Angeles County, California
Cinema of Southern California
History of Pomona, California
Buildings and structures on the National Register of Historic Places in Los Angeles County, California
Theatres on the National Register of Historic Places in California
Theatres completed in 1931
1931 establishments in California
Art Deco architecture in California
Concert halls in California
Music venues in California